Vijay Inder Singla (born 1 December 1971) is an Indian politician. He is former member of Punjab Legislative Assembly. He is a  former minister in the current council of ministers of Punjab government and heads the Public Works Department and Administrative Reforms. He was a Congress Member of Parliament from Sangrur Lok Sabha constituency in Punjab from 2009 to 2014. In 2014, he lost Lok Sabha election from Sangrur to Bhagwant Mann with a margin of 3,51,827 votes. In 2017, he won Sangrur constituency with margin of 30000 votes. In 2022, he lost to Narinder Kaur Bharaj of AAP, with margin of 36,430 votes. His father Sant Ram Singla was also Congress MP, and was Minister in first term of Captain Amarinder Singh Government in Punjab. Recently, he has been given key profile in AICC, as a Secretary, AICC to the AICC Treasurer. Earlier, he has been national spokesperson of Congress.

Early life and education

Vijay Inder Singla did his matriculation from Yadavindra Public School, Patiala in 1987 and intermediate from Multani Mal Modi College, Patiala in 1989. He has a Bachelor of Engineering degree in (Computer Science) from B.M.S. College of Engineering, Bangalore, Karnataka.

Political career

Youth Politics

His political career began with Punjab Youth Congress as general secretary from 2002 - 2004 and vice-president later. On his father's death he was appointed chairman of Punjab Energy Development Authority in 2005 by the Chief Minister of Punjab Amarinder Singh. He was President of Punjab Youth Congress from 2006 to 2008 and was assigned the task of conducting the first Youth Congress elections in Punjab as a pilot project which was thereafter replicated throughout India. He was made Member of Indian Youth Congress Election Commission (2010-2012) which was responsible for conducting Youth Congress elections in India to identify fresh grassroot talent, known to be a close confidant of Rahul Gandhi brigade.

Parliament

In 2009 he was elected to Lok Sabha from Sangrur Lok Sabha by defeating Sukhdev Singh Dhindsa from Shiromani Akali Dal by a margin of more than 40000 votes.
Vijay Inder Singla in his first term as MP is credited with bringing major development projects to this backward region including a 300-bed PGI Sangrur Hospital with an outlay of Rs 449 crore which will change the profile of the constituency with specialized medical treatment, more jobs and better business opportunities. The project has been delayed and heavily criticized by the opposition SAD. Moreover, his efforts in providing greater rail and road connectivity are appreciable like starting of Shatabdi Express from Sangrur, Panj Takht Yatra train, new trains to Sirsa, Ajmer, Jammu etc., rail track electrification and railway overbridges to ease traffic congestion. Although, these trains were one time affair, people still are happy with his efforts. He brought projects in the Sports field like Synthetic Athletic Track at Sangrur and SAI sports coaching centre at Barnala, undertook extensive rural development works from MPLAD fund in the fields of education, health, community development, sports and public utilities.
He represented India at the 64th session of UN General Assembly in New York City in November 2013 and spoke on Palestine refugee issue.
He is a Member of Indian Council of World Affairs, National Platform for Disaster Risk Reduction, Institute & Governing Body of Post Graduate Institute of Medical Education & Research (Chandigarh), Regional Direct Taxes Advisory Committee, Patiala (Punjab) and Chairman of Regional Consultative Committee on Food Corporation of India (Punjab) and has been pursuing the cause of stakeholders through these forums and bodies.

In 2014 he lost Lok Sabha election from Sangrur constituency. Bhagwant Mann defeated him with a hefty margin of 3,51,827 votes.

Electoral performance

Parliament: Lok Sabha

Punjab Assembly

References

External links
 

1971 births
Living people
India MPs 2009–2014
Indian National Congress politicians
Lok Sabha members from Punjab, India
Punjab, India MLAs 2012–2017
People from Sangrur district
Punjab, India MLAs 2017–2022